The People and Justice Union (centrists, nationalists) is an agrarian-centrist political party in Lithuania. Since the Seimas elections in 2016, it has been represented in the parliament and has also had representatives at the municipal level. The leader of the party is MP Naglis Puteikis. Its honorary leader was noted Lithuanian philosopher and nationalist thinker Romualdas Ozolas.

Background
The party was established as the National Centre Party (Nacionalinę centro partiją), before being renamed the  Lithuanian Centre Party (Lietuvos Centro partija) in 2005.

In the parliamentary election of 2016, the Lithuanian Centre Party participated in a coalition (Anti-corruption coalition of Kristupas Krivickas and Naglis Puteikis) with the Lithuanian Pensioners' Party and received 6.1% of the popular vote. In the 2019 Lithuanian municipal elections, the Centre Party received 1.25% of votes nationwide and won municipal council seats in Klaipeda, Varena and Alytus (increasing the number of seats from 3 to 8). During the 2019 election to the European Parliament the party received 5.13% of the national vote, but did not receive any representatives in the European Parliament. On October 26, 2019, the Congress of the Lithuanian Centre Party decided to change the official name of the party to the Centre Party "Welfare Lithuania". The party fully supports the welfare state idea of the President of the Republic of Lithuania Gitanas Nausėda. In 2020, the party's name was changed again, this time to the Centre Party – Nationalists. In 2021 it merged with the Lithuanian Nationalist and Republican Union to become the People and Justice Union.

References

Agrarian parties in Lithuania
Centrist parties in Lithuania
Conservative parties in Lithuania
Nationalist parties in Lithuania
Political parties established in 2003